The 2006–07 Eredivisie season began on August 18, 2006. The season saw PSV Eindhoven quickly building a gap with the other teams. After 20 matches, the club was 11 points ahead of AZ and 12 points ahead of Ajax. The lead quickly dissipated in the 13 matches that followed. A draw of PSV at FC Utrecht in the penultimate round saw AZ and Ajax catching up. The three clubs were all on 72 points from 33 matches, with the AZ on top due to goal difference. Ajax were second, PSV were third. AZ suffered a shock defeat at league minnows Excelsior Rotterdam in the final round, playing with 10 men after 15 minutes in the game. Ajax won 0–2 at Willem II, and PSV beat Vitesse 5–1. PSV and Ajax both finished on 75 points, but PSV finished first due to a better goal difference (+50, against +49 for Ajax) to end one of the most exciting and closest title races in many years.

Promoted team
This team was promoted from the Eerste Divisie at the start of the season:
 Excelsior (Eerste Divisie champions)

Relegated teams
The following teams were relegated to the Eerste Divisie at the end of the season:
ADO Den Haag
RKC Waalwijk

Promoted teams
The following teams were promoted from the Eerste Divisie at the end of the season:
De Graafschap
VVV-Venlo

League table

Results

Play-offs

For UEFA competitions
For one Champions League ticket and three UEFA Cup tickets 

 Ajax have qualified for 2007–08 UEFA Champions League. AZ, FC Twente and Heerenveen have qualified for the 2007–08 UEFA Cup.

For one UEFA Cup ticket and possibly one Intertoto Cup ticket

FC Groningen have qualified for the 2007–08 UEFA Cup. FC Utrecht faced Vitesse (the team winning match J) for one ticket to the UEFA Intertoto Cup 2007.

For possibly one Intertoto Cup ticket

 Vitesse faced FC Utrecht (the team losing match G) for one ticket to the UEFA Intertoto Cup 2007.

For the Intertoto Cup ticket

 FC Utrecht have qualified for the UEFA Intertoto Cup 2007.

Relegation playoffs
Round 1

All teams play a home and an away match, with the possibility of a third match in case of a tie. The team that has scored the most away goals in the first two legs will play the deciding third leg at home. If both teams have scored an equal amount of away goals, a penalty shootout after the second leg will decide who plays at home in the third leg.
Round 2

All teams play a home and an away match, with the possibility of a third match in case of a tie. The team that has scored the most away goals in the first two legs will play the deciding third leg at home. If both teams have scored an equal amount of away goals, a penalty shootout after the second leg will decide who plays at home in the third leg.
Round 3

All teams play a home and an away match, with the possibility of a third match in case of a tie. The team that has scored the most away goals in the first two legs will play the deciding third leg at home. If both teams have scored an equal amount of away goals, a penalty shootout after the second leg will decide who plays at home in the third leg.

The winners of matches G and H will play in the Eredivisie 2007/2008

Top scorers

Awards

Dutch Footballer of the Year
 2006 / 2007 — Afonso Alves (SC Heerenveen)

Stadiums

See also
2006–07 KNVB Cup
2006–07 Eerste Divisie

External links
 Eredivisie.nl - Official website Eredivisie 
 KNVB.nl - Official website KNVB 
 Eredivisie on rsssf.com 

Eredivisie seasons
Netherlands
1